OR Tambo is one of the seven districts of Eastern Cape province of South Africa. The seat of OR Tambo is Mthatha (formerly spelt Umtata). The vast majority (94%) of its 1,364,943 people speak Xhosa (2011 Census). The district is named after Oliver Tambo. The district code is DC15.

The district is within Wild Coast Region.

Geography

Neighbours
OR Tambo is surrounded by:
 Alfred Nzo District (DC44) to the north
 the Indian Ocean to the south-east
 Amatole District (DC12) to the south-west
 Chris Hani District (DC13) to the west
 Joe Gqabi District (DC14) to the north-west

Local municipalities
The district contains the following local municipalities:

After the 2011 municipal election, OR Tambo District shrunk, with Mbizana and Ntabankulu local municipalities being transferred to Alfred Nzo District Municipality.

Demographics
The following statistics are from the 2011 census.

Gender

Ethnic group

Age

Politics

Election results
Election results for OR Tambo in the South African general election, 2004.
 Population 18 and over: 782 012 (46.65% of total population)
 Total votes: 496 206 (29.60% of total population)
 Voting % estimate: 63.45% votes as a % of population 18 and over

References

External links
 Official website 

District municipalities of the Eastern Cape